Stratton may refer to:

People
 Stratton (surname)

Places

Australia
 Stratton, Western Australia

Canada
 Stratton, Ontario

England
 Stratton, Cornwall
 Stratton, Dorset
 Stratton, Gloucestershire
 Stratton-on-the-Fosse, Somerset
 Stratton Hall, Suffolk
 Stratton St Margaret, Wiltshire

United States
 Stratton, California, original name of Cuyamaca, California; also the former name of Stratford, California
 Stratton, Colorado
 Stratton, Maine
 Stratton (Centreville, Maryland)
 Stratton, Nebraska
 Stratton, Ohio
 Stratton, Vermont, New England town
 Stratton Mountain (Vermont), mountain in the town
 Stratton Mountain Resort, ski area on the mountain
 Stratton Mountain, Vermont, resort community at base of ski area
 Stratton, Virginia
 Stratton Lake, a lake in Minnesota

Other uses
 Stratton (film), a 2017 British film
 Stratton (crater), a lunar crater
 Stratton (company), an English manufacturer of powder compacts and other cosmetics-related metal items.
 Stratton (financial services), an Australian finance brokerage
 USCGC Stratton (WMSL-752), a US Coast Guard cutter named for Dorothy C. Stratton
 Danny Stratton, lead character in S.M.A.R.T. Chase, a 2017 British-Chinese film (unrelated to the film Stratton)

See also
 Stratton Upper School, an upper school in Biggleswade, Bedfordshire, England

Stretton (disambiguation)
Justice Stratton (disambiguation)
Straton (disambiguation)